Dmitry Alexandrovich Smirnov (born 13 August 1980) is a Russian former football player.

Career
He holds the record for Luch for most league goals in a year (19 goals in 2005) and left on 7 January 2009 the club and moved to FC Terek Grozny.

Personal
His father, Aleksandr Smirnov, played in the Soviet Top League for FC Spartak Moscow.

Characteristics
He is not related to Dmitri Nikolayevich Smirnov with whom he played on the same team for several years for FC Torpedo-ZIL Moscow, Luch and Tom. To avoid confusion, he is usually referred to as Dmitri A. Smirnov or Smirnov I.

External links
 Player page by sportbox.ru  
 
 Player page on the official Luch-Energiya website 
 

Russian footballers
Living people
Footballers from Moscow
1980 births
FC Moscow players
FC Spartak Moscow players
FC Chernomorets Novorossiysk players
FC Spartak Vladikavkaz players
FC Luch Vladivostok players
FC Akhmat Grozny players
FC Tom Tomsk players
Russian Premier League players
FC Mordovia Saransk players
Russian expatriate footballers
Expatriate footballers in Ukraine
FC Arsenal Tula players
Association football midfielders